Le Retour à la Raison (Return to Reason) is a 1923 film directed by Man Ray. It consists of animated textures, Rayographs and the torso of Kiki of Montparnasse (Alice Prin).

See also
Cinéma Pur

Notes
The film features a small segment with his work Danger.

Sources
Flicks - March 2001 ; Chris Dashiell (2001)

External links

 Downloadable version of the film at ubu.com
 Film Review

1923 films
Films directed by Man Ray
French silent short films
French black-and-white films
1920s French films